The Black Reel Award for Television for Outstanding Comedy Series is an annual award given to the best television comedy series of the year. Atlanta became the first winner in this category. Atlanta and Insecure are both tied for most wins in this category with two each. Black-ish holds the record with the most nominations with 5.

2010s

2020s

Programs with multiple awards

2 awards
 Atlanta (consecutive)
 Insecure (consecutive)

Programs with multiple nominations

5 nominations 
 black-ish

4 nominations 
 Insecure

3 nominations
 grown-ish

2 nominations
 Atlanta
 Ballers
 Dear White People

Total awards by network
 HBO - 3
 FX - 2

References

Black Reel Awards